Sereshbar (also Romanized as Sereshbār and Sarashbar; also known as Chahārāshpar, Serīshbār, and Serīsh Bār) is a village in Zarrineh Rud Rural District, Bizineh Rud District, Khodabandeh County, Zanjan Province, Iran. At the 2006 census, its population was 273, in 49 families.

References 

Populated places in Khodabandeh County